Mashima Hero's (stylized as Mashima HERO'S and formerly known as Hero's) is a Japanese manga series written and illustrated by Hiro Mashima. The series is a crossover between three of Mashima's previous works, Rave Master, Fairy Tail, and Edens Zero.

Synopsis 
The manga begins with Fairy Tail characters Natsu Dragneel, Lucy Heartfilia and the anthropomorphic cat Happy relaxing on True Island. While on the island, Natsu meets Shiki Granbell and Rebecca Bluegarden, the protagonists of Edens Zero. Shiki and Rebecca reveal that they came to the island in search of something called "Oasis". Meanwhile, Haru Glory has come with his friends Elie and Hamrio Musica from the universe of Rave Master to destroy Oasis.

Publication
The crossover series is written and illustrated by Hiro Mashima. It started serialization in Weekly Shōnen Magazine on October 24, 2019. The series ended in Weekly Shōnen Magazine on December 25, 2019. The series was published in a single tankōbon volume, which was released on April 17, 2020. In the same month, the series was renamed from Hero's to Mashima Hero's so the series could rank higher in search engine results.

In March 2020, Kodansha USA announced they licensed the series for English publication. They released the volume on December 1, 2020.

Reception
Demelza from Anime UK News praised the series, calling it "entertaining" and suggesting that fans of Mashima's work would enjoy it. Erkael from Manga News also offered it praise as they felt that reading it was a fun experience. Christel Scheja of Splash Comics wrote positively about the series, while also stating it can be hard to understand for someone who hasn't read any of the works featured. Faustine Lillaz from Planete BD had similar feelings about the series, stating that while it is not a masterpiece, it had good artwork and a solid story.

Notes

References

External links
 

Adventure anime and manga
Crossover anime and manga
Fantasy anime and manga
Hiro Mashima
Kodansha manga
Shōnen manga